Frank William "Menty" Keaney (June 5, 1886 – October 10, 1967) was an American football, basketball, and baseball coach and college athletics administrator.  As a college men's basketball coach, he was known as the architect of modern "run-and-shoot" basketball and the inventor of the fast break.

Keaney was a native of Boston, Massachusetts, and attended Cambridge Latin School, graduating in 1906. He graduated from Bates College, where he played several sports, in 1911.  He was the head football coach at Everett High School in Massachusetts from 1917 to 1919.  He coached at Rhode Island State College (now the University of Rhode Island) from 1920 to 1948 and taught a style of basketball using a fast-breaking offense and a full-court defense. In his 28 years at Rhode Island, Keaney's basketball Rams won eight conference championships and had only one losing season. In 1939, Keaney's Rams became the first college team to score more than 50 points per game, and in 1943 the team had an average of more than two points per minute (80.7 points per game), which led to the Rams being dubbed "The Firehouse Gang". During his tenure the URI team had four National Invitation Tournament appearances. Keaney's career record with the men's basketball team was 401–124 (.764).

After retiring from coaching collegiate basketball, Keaney was offered the position of head coach of the Boston Celtics. Keaney's doctor, however, refused to let him take the job.  He remained at URI as athletic director until 1959.  The university named the Frank W. Keaney Gymnasium-Armory in his honor in 1953. Keaney was inducted into the Basketball Hall of Fame in 1960.

Head coaching record

College football

References

External links
 
 

1886 births
1967 deaths
American men's basketball players
Basketball coaches from Massachusetts
Basketball players from Boston
Bates Bobcats baseball players
Bates Bobcats football players
Bates Bobcats men's basketball players
Cambridge Rindge and Latin School alumni
College men's basketball head coaches in the United States
High school baseball coaches in the United States
High school basketball coaches in Massachusetts
High school football coaches in Massachusetts
Naismith Memorial Basketball Hall of Fame inductees
National Collegiate Basketball Hall of Fame inductees
Rhode Island Rams athletic directors
Rhode Island Rams baseball coaches
Rhode Island Rams football coaches
Rhode Island Rams men's basketball coaches
Sportspeople from Boston